Roger Da Costa (born 22 April 1986 in Johannesburg, Gauteng) is a South African football player who plays as a defender for Aris Limassol. He previously played for Moroka Swallows and Mpumalanga Black Aces.

References

1986 births
Living people
Association football defenders
Sportspeople from Johannesburg
South African soccer players
South African expatriate soccer players
White South African people
Moroka Swallows F.C. players
Mpumalanga Black Aces F.C. players
Aris Limassol FC players
Austin Aztex U23 players
Expatriate footballers in Cyprus
Cypriot First Division players
South African people of Portuguese descent